Radiant Door is the second EP by the noise pop band Crystal Stilts. It was released in 2011 through Sacred Bones.

Track listing
 "Dark Eyes" – 4:17
 "Radiant Door" – 3:11
 "Still As the Night" – 3:13
 "Low Profile" – 5:05
 "Frost Inside the Asylums" – 5:47

Personnel
 Brad Hargett – vocals
 JB Townsend – guitar
 Kyle Forester – keyboards
 Andy Adler – bass
 Keegan Cooke – drums

References

2011 EPs
Crystal Stilts albums
Post-punk EPs
Noise pop EPs